"Badass" is a song by the American rock band Saliva, the second single from their seventh studio album Under Your Skin (2011). While the single was released to radio and digital download on March 8, 2011, the song was first introduced in the successful horror blockbuster Saw 3D (2010) and it was also featured in TV ads for the film Bullet to the Head.

"Badass" would become the most successful single from Under Your Skin, reaching #26 on the US Billboard Mainstream Rock Songs chart.

A music video was made for "Badass." It debuted online on April 12, 2011.

Charts

References

External links
 

Saliva (band) songs
2011 songs
Songs written by Howard Benson
Island Records singles
Songs written by Josey Scott
Song recordings produced by Howard Benson